Julia Russell (born 22 April 1975) is a South African swimmer. She competed in three events at the 1996 Summer Olympics.

References

External links
 

1975 births
Living people
South African female swimmers
Olympic swimmers of South Africa
Swimmers at the 1996 Summer Olympics
Place of birth missing (living people)
African Games medalists in swimming
Competitors at the 1995 All-Africa Games
African Games silver medalists for South Africa